Great Meadows may refer to:
Great Meadows, New Jersey, an unincorporated area within Liberty Township, New Jersey
Battle of the Great Meadows or Battle of Fort Necessity, a 1754 battle of the French and Indian War in Pennsylvania
Great Meadows National Wildlife Refuge, a wildlife refuge in Concord, Massachusetts
Great Meadows (Connecticut River), a floodplain south of Hartford, Connecticut
 Great Meadows Salt Marsh, a unit of the Stewart B. McKinney National Wildlife Refuge in Connecticut
 Great Meadow (Velyky Luh), a specific territory of the southern portions of Central Ukraine in several historical sources that is today mostly flooded by the Kakhovka Reservoir

See also
 Great Meadow, a steeplechase course in Plains, Virginia
 Great Meadow Correctional Facility, a prison in Comstock, New York